The 2022 South American Artistic Gymnastics Championships was held in Lima, Peru, from August 17 to 21, 2022. The competition was approved by the International Gymnastics Federation.

Medalists

Participating nations

Medal table

See also
 Gymnastics at the 2022 South American Games

References

South American Artistic Gymnastics Championships, 2022
South American Gymnastics Championships
International gymnastics competitions hosted by Peru
2022 in Peruvian sport
South American Artistic Gymnastics Championships